Evergreen Elementary School may refer to:
Evergreen Elementary, school in Mead School District, Spokane, Washington, USA
Evergreen Elementary School (Wrangell), school in Wrangell, Alaska, USA
Evergreen Elementary School (Marion County), school in Marion County, Florida, USA
Evergreen Elementary School (Quebec), Lester B. Pearson School Board school in Saint-Lazare, Quebec, Canada